The Loddon River, an inland river of the northcentral catchment, part of the Murray-Darling basin, is located in the lower Riverina bioregion and Central Highlands and Loddon Mallee regions of the Australian state of Victoria. The headwaters of the Loddon River rise on the northern slopes of the Great Dividing Range east of Daylesford and descend to flow north into the Little Murray River, near Swan Hill. The river is impounded by the Cairn Curran (147,000 ML) and Laanecoorie (12,000 ML) reservoirs.  The Tullaroop Creek tributary, which joins just above Laanecoorie Reservoir, is impounded by the Tullaroop Reservoir (72,950ML). 

An anabranch of the Loddon River may be found in the upper reaches of the river.

Location and features

The Loddon River is the second longest river in Victoria after the Goulburn and, along with the Avoca River, drains a substantial part of central Victoria. From source to mouth, the river is joined by nineteen minor tributaries; and descends  over its  course.

The river then passes  with high summer flows that commence at the small concrete weir to the Loddon Weir, also known as Fernihurst Weir. After the weir, water is diverted to the Waranga Western Channel. The final stretch of the river flows through saltbush and black box forest. The river ends at its confluence with the Little Murray River at Benjeroop, near Swan Hill.

Recreational pursuits
When reasonable water levels flow, the Mill Rapid downstream of the Calder Hwy bridge provides technical whitewater kayaking of Grade 3 standard featuring a short fast run. Access is usually via local roads on the west bank. Upstream of the Calder Hwy bridge kayakers and canoeists will have a pleasant paddling experience but may have to share the river with swimmers, fishers, and waterskiers.

At Bridgewater there is a designated  general waterskiing area, a  slalom and ski jump area. Waterskiing events held in this area include the Australian Masters in January, the pre-Moomba tournament in February and the Bridgewater Ski Club Tournament. Additionally, a  swimming area is designated at the Flour Mill Weir.

Fish found between Bridgewater to Serpentine include Murray cod and golden perch. A vertical slot fishway was constructed next to the Kerang Weir in 2008. The main fish species in the river's lower reaches are redfin, golden perch and Murray cod.

There are weirs in Bridgewater and Kerang to keep water in the towns, but otherwise the river can dry up in summer. There is current work going on to determine and implement suitable environmental flows in the river. The pool upstream of the Bridgewater weir is used for watersports such as waterskiing. Both reservoirs are also used for motor boats and sailing. At the Loddon Weir there is road access which enables boats to be launched from the bank.

River crossings
The river is crossed by the Daylesford-Malmsbury Road at Glenlyon; the Drummond-Vaughan Forest Road crosses the river at three locations and the Porcupine Ridge Road crosses near the Vaughan Springs area. Further river crossings are encountered  at Kemps Bridge Road, the Midland Highway south of Guildford, as well as Punt Road and the Pyrenees Highway in Newstead. The river is crossed by the Baringhup Road, and subsequently by the Baringhup West-Eastville Road, Rumbolds Road, Pickerings Lane, Back Eddington Road and Bendigo-Maryborough Road at Eddington. At Laanecoorie, the river is crossed by the Janevale bridge, a reinforced concrete girder bridge built in 1911 which is listed as a Heritage Place in the Victorian Heritage Register, and then northwards to Newbridge where it is crossed by the Wimmera Highway. At Bridgewater the river is crossed by the Calder Highway and the Eaglehawk-Inglewood railway line. A further road crossing is encountered at Bridgewater-Serpentine Road, to the south of Serpentine.

Road crossings between Serpentine and Loddon weirs include Lagoona Road, Borung-Hurstwood Road, Ellerslie Road, Majors Line Road, Boort-Pyramid Road, Boort-Yando Road, Canary Island-Leaghur Road, Appin South Road, Hewitt Road and Wood Lane. In Kerang the river is crossed by the Old Kerang Road, Murray Valley Highway and the Yungera railway line. After Kerang the river is crossed by West Road, O'Donoghues Bridge Road, Baulch Road and the Wells Bridge which carries the Lake Charm Road.

Etymology
As the river is relatively long, indigenous peoples from various cultural groups lived near the river course. In an undefined Aboriginal language, the names for the river are Yolelerwil-meerin and Byerr, both with no defined meaning. In the Djadjawurrung language, the names for the river are Yarrayn, Minne-minne and Pullergil-yaluk, all with no clearly defined meaning. In the Wembawemba language, the name for the river is Woppoon, with no clearly defined meaning. In the Djadjawurrung and the Barababaraba languages, the name for the river is Gunbungwerro, with werro and wurru meaning "lips" or "mouth". In the Gannawarra and Barababaraba languages, the name for the river is Mudyin gadjin, meaning "[he] picked up water".

It was named by Thomas Mitchell in 1836 after the River Loddon in the English counties of Berkshire and Hampshire.

See also

References

External links

Goulburn-Murray Water Loddon storages

Biodiversity Information, Resources, Data - Loddon River page
North Central Catchment Management Authority

North-Central catchment
Rivers of Grampians (region)
Rivers of Loddon Mallee (region)
Tributaries of the Murray River
Central Highlands (Victoria)
Mallee (Victoria)